Tenom Pangi Dam is the hydroelectric plant in Tenom, Sabah, Malaysia. The project is a run-of-river hydroelectric power plant. Tenom Pangi Dam is the only major hydroelectric dam in Sabah. 

The power station has three turbines of 22 MW installed capacity totaling 66 MW. Continuous power output is 66 MW. Average annual energy output is 400 GWh. The station is operated by Sabah Electricity.

Construction started in 1978 and was completed in 1984. The plant suffered extensive flood damage in 1988, where the trash rack and log boom were washed away and damaged the intake and gate machinery. It was refurbished in 2003.

Specifications
The permanent dam components are as follows:
 Power Intake Structure – 3 bays.
 Spillway – gated concrete weir run-off river type..
 Power Tunnels – 3 exposed penstock..
 Powerhouse 
 Powerhouse – above ground 4 levels
 With 3 penstocks to powertrains comprising 3 turbines of 22MW each, 4 air-cooled generators of 25MVA each and 3 transformers of 25MVA each.

See also

 Sabah Electricity
 Tenaga Nasional
 Batang Ai Dam

References
Japan ODA Bank document

External links
 Sabah Electricity website

1984 establishments in Malaysia
Buildings and structures in Sabah
Dams in Malaysia
Dams completed in 1984
Hydroelectric power stations in Malaysia
Tenom District